Jess Roden (born 28 December 1947) is an English rock singer, songwriter and guitarist.

Biography
Roden's first band was The Raiders followed by The Shakedown Sound which also included the guitarist, Kevyn Gammond, and keyboard player, August Eadon (aka Gus Yeadon).

In 1966, he joined The Alan Bown Set as their new lead singer. Although their records rarely charted, Roden and the band did pick up a considerable fan base in London, and belatedly became a minor star on the Northern soul scene, with the release of their single, "Emergency 999".

He remained with the Alan Bown through to the late 1960s, but left after recording the album The Alan Bown! His vocals were re-recorded by his replacement Robert Palmer for the UK release of the album, although Roden's original vocals remained on the US release. Roden later appeared as a backing vocalist to Palmer on his 1983 appearance on The Tube.

In 1970, Roden returned to Worcestershire and formed Bronco who toured extensively with Island Records' label-mates Traffic, Free, Mott the Hoople, Fotheringay, and John Martyn but left after two albums to embark on a solo album. During this period, he also sang on Wildlife, the third Mott the Hoople album, and sang and played on albums by Carol Grimes, Jim Capaldi, Sandy Denny, and sang lead vocals on Keef Hartley's 1973 album Lancashire Hustler.

His solo album plans were sidelined when, in the same year, he was asked to team up with ex-Doors John Densmore and Robby Krieger in The Butts Band, together with Phil Chen (bass) and Roy Davies (keyboards). Their first album was recorded in London and Kingston, Jamaica and released in the United States on Blue Thumb Records and Island Records (rest of the world). The Butts Band played a short US tour including multiple dates at New York's Max's Kansas City, a handful of British dates including opening for The Kinks at London's Finsbury Park Astoria, later The Rainbow Theatre as well as recording one session for BBC TV's The Old Grey Whistle Test after which Roden, Chen, and Davies left the group.

Roden finally emerged as a solo artist in the mid 1970s on Island Records with his 1974 self-titled solo album. It was recorded at Olympic Studios and Basing Street Studios in London, as well as at Sea-Saint Studios in New Orleans, Louisiana. This record included contributions from Allen Toussaint and The Meters from the US sessions and in London, John Bundrick and Mick Weaver (keyboards), Steve Webb (guitar), Richard Bailey, and Simon Kirke (drums).

He then formed The Jess Roden Band (originally Iguana – based in Southampton). The initial album sessions were with Steve Smith (and featured Steve Winwood on Hammond organ), but these were eventually discarded in favour of producer Geoff Haslam, with whom the group's first two studio album were recorded – Keep Your Hat On and Play It Dirty, Play It Class. A major touring draw, the band never achieved significant record sales and disbanded in early 1977. This was after the release of their live album, Blowin''', which was recorded during capacity shows at Birmingham Town Hall and Leicester University in late 1976. Their final show was, however, also recorded and later issued as Live at the BBC.

Following the ending of the JRB, Roden relocated to New York City and cut two further solo albums for Island (The Player Not The Game and Stonechaser) after which his association with Island ended. He formed The Rivits with Peter Wood (who had co-written "Year of the Cat" with Al Stewart), for one album Multiplay; the album was released by Antilles in North America and via Island for the rest of the world. The Rivits played two UK shows only; one in Stamford in Lincolnshire, the other at The Venue in Victoria, London.

During initial sessions for a second Rivits album that had begun to be recorded at Compass Point Studios in the Bahamas, Roden sang back-up vocals for Grace Jones', Pull Up to the Bumper. With the sessions incomplete (Woods had to leave to re-join Pink Floyd's band of musicians for The Wall tour) and on returning to New York, Roden and Island parted for the final time.

He began a new career as a graphic artist while, at the same time, recording Seven Windows, an album that was produced by Steve Dwire (who had played bass on The Rivits' album) and A. T. Michael MacDonald that featured the cream of New York-based session players / arrangers (including Elliot Randall, Mark Egan, Jack Waldman, Rob Mounsey, Michael Dawe, Lou Marini, and Paul Buckmaster). Just before the album was released, Roden returned to live and work in the UK.

Combining graphic art with music, he recorded two albums with a new band, The Humans (named by Jim Capaldi) with a line-up that featured Gary Grainger, Bill Burke and Nick Graham; the group also recorded with Steve Winwood and Jim Capaldi. Subsequent to the release of both records and due to work commitments, Roden's live appearances became increasingly rare with occasional performances with the SAS band that featured Roy Wood, Roger Taylor, Brian May, and Paul Young.

In 2009, Lemon Recordings (a subsidiary of Cherry Red) issued a 'Best Of...' and, a year later, BGO issued both Bronco albums as a single CD package.

During the winter of 2009, deep archive research began into a full-scale Anthology – designed to encompass Roden's entire musical career. During this process, well over 800 pieces of music were logged (and in the vast majority of instances, digitised for the first time) from which a career defining Anthology has been compiled. The set, Hidden Masters: The Jess Roden Anthology, which includes over 50% of previously unheard material – was issued as a limited edition, first pressing of 950 copies, 6-CD set by Hidden Masters in 2013.

Selective discography
SoloJess Roden (1974)The Player Not the Game (1977)Stonechaser (1980)

The Jess Roden BandKeep Your Hat On (1976)Play It Dirty, Play It Class (1976)Blowin' (1977)Live at the BBC (released 1993)

Alan BownLondon Swings – Live at the Marquee (1967) One side of an album also featuring Jimmy James & The VagabondsEmergency 999 (CD which collects all early Alan Bown singles featuring Roden)Outward Bown First Album (1968)The Alan Bown! (1969) (US edition only)

BroncoCountry Home (1970)Ace of Sunlight (1971)Smoking Mixture (1973)

Butts BandButts_Band (1973)

The RivitsMultiplay (1980)

Seven WindowsSeven Windows (1986)

The HumansJess Roden and The Humans (1995)Live at The Robin 1996 (2004)

CompilationsJess Roden – The Best Of... (2009) CD via Lemon (a subsidiary of Cherry Red)Bronco – Country Home & Ace of Sunlight Both albums reissued as a 2for1 by BGO Records (November 2010)Outward Bown (2012) – CD reissue via Grapefruit (a subsidiary of Cherry Red)Hidden Masters | The Jess Roden Anthology – a hand-numbered, 94 track, 6-CD box set, 12" hard-back book format limited edition (bonus 6th CD only available with the 1st edition); Exclusive availability via HiddenMasters.net. First edition (pressing) limited to 950 copies only.

Other appearances
 The Who – "Magic Bus" (backing vocals) (1968)
 Mott the Hoople – Wildlife (backing vocals) (1971)
 Keef Hartley – Lancashire Hustler (lead vocals) (1973)
 Paul Kossoff – Back Street Crawler (Roden sang lead on "I'm Ready" and harmony with Paul Rodgers on "Molten Gold") (1973)
 Carol Grimes – Warm Blood (backing vocals) (1974)
 Jim Capaldi – Short Cut Draw Blood (guitarist) (1975)
 Stomu Yamashta – Go Too (1977)
 Sandy Denny – Rendezvous (backing vocals) (1977)
 Grace Jones – Nightclubbing (backing vocals) (1981)
 Seven Windows – Seven Windows (1986)
 Peter Green – Rattlesnake Guitar: The Music of Peter Green (Roden sang on two tracks "Crying Won't Bring You Back" and "Merry Go Round") (1995) 
 Luther Grosvenor – Floodgates (Roden sang on two tracks "I Wanna Be Free" and "Fire Down Below") (1996) 
 SAS Band – (Roden sang on "That's The Way God Planned It") (1998)
 Sandy Denny – A Boxful of Treasures'' (includes "Losing Game" – duet with Roden) (2004)

References

External links
Official website
Jess Roden entry on Wyfopedia
 Unsung Heroes No 1: Jess Roden A blog commentary that has turned into an informal Jess Roden discussion group.
website for Steve Webb, guitarist with the Jess Roden Band

1947 births
Living people
People from Kidderminster
English rock singers
English male singers
English rock guitarists
Island Records artists
English male guitarists
The Alan Bown Set members